The American Society of Landscape Architects Medal is awarded annually by the American Society of Landscape Architects (ASLA) to a landscape architect whose lifetime achievements and contributions to the profession have had a unique and lasting impact on the welfare of the public and the environment.

History
The honor has been given each year since 1971. Only three winners were not ASLA fellows: Sylvia Crowe, Geoffrey Jellicoe, and Norman Newton.

List of winners

 2021 - Darwina Neal
 2020 - Anne Whiston Spirn
 2019 - Carol Franklin
 2018 - Linda Jewell
 2017 - Charles Birnbaum
 2016 - Kurt Culbertson
 2015 - M. Paul Friedberg
 2014 - Richard Bell
 2013 - Warren T. Byrd Jr.
 2012 - Cornelia Oberlander
 2011 - Laurie Olin
 2010 - Edward L. Daugherty
 2009 - Joseph E. Brown
 2008 - Joe A. Porter
 2007 - William B. Callaway
 2006 - Cameron R. Man
 2005 - Jane Silverstein Ries
 2004 - Peter Walker
 2003 - Richard Haag
 2002 - Morgan Evans
 2001 - Robert E. Marvin
 2000 - Carl D. Johnson
 1999 - Stuart O. Dawson
 1998 - Carol R. Johnson
 1997 - Julius G. Fabos
 1996 - John T. Lyle
 1995 - Ervin H. Zube
 1994 - Edward Durell Stone, Jr.
 1993 - Arthur Edwin Bye
 1992 - Robert S. Reich
 1991 - Meade Palmer
 1990 - Raymond L. Freeman
 1989 - Robert Royston
 1988 - Sylvia Crowe
 1987 - Philip H. Lewis Jr.
 1986 - William J. Johnson
 1985 - Roberto Burle Marx
 1984 - Ian McHarg
 1983 - Theodore O. Osmundson
 1982 - Charles W. Eliot II
 1981 - Geoffrey Jellicoe
 1980 - William G. Swain
 1979 - Norman Newton
 1978 - Lawrence Halprin
 1977 - Hubert Bond Owens
 1976 - Thomas Church
 1975 - Garrett Eckbo
 1974 - Campbell E. Miller
 1973 - John O. Simonds
 1972 - Conrad L. Wirth
 1971 - Hideo Sasaki

See also
List of lifetime achievement awards

References

External links
Official site

Awards established in 1971
Lifetime achievement awards
American architecture awards
Landscape architecture